Ilema is a genus of tussock moths in the family Erebidae. The genus was described by Walker in 1855 and renamed by Moore in 1860, because Walker's chosen name was preoccupied.

Selected species
Ilema altichalana Holloway, 1999 Borneo
Ilema baruna (Moore, 1859) Java, Sumatra, Borneo
Ilema callima Collenette, 1932
Ilema chalana (Moore, [1860]) Java, Sumatra, Peninsular Malaysia, Borneo
Ilema chalanoides Schintlmeister, 1994
Ilema chloroptera (Hampson, [1893]) north-eastern Himalayas
Ilema coreana Matsumura, 1933
Ilema costalis (Walker, 1855) Java
Ilema costiplaga (Walker, 1862) Borneo, Sumatra, Peninsular Malaysia
Ilema eurydice (Butler, 1885) Japan, Korea, Amur, Askold, Tonkin
Ilema jankowskii (Oberthür, 1884) Amur
Ilema kosemponica (Strand, 1914)
Ilema melanochlora Hampson, 1895
Ilema montanata Holloway, 1982 Borneo, Sumatra
Ilema nachiensis (Marumo, 1917)
Ilema nigrofascia (Wileman, 1911)
Ilema olivacea (Wileman, 1910)
Ilema petrilineata (Bryk, 1935) Peninsular Malaysia, Borneo
Ilema preangerensis (Heylaerts, 1892) Java, Sumatra, Borneo
Ilema vaneeckei (Collenette, 1932) Peninsular Malaysia, Sumatra, Borneo
Ilema virescens (Moore, 1879) Himalayas
Ilema viridis Druce, 1899

References

Lymantriinae
Moth genera